The 2017–18 ISU Grand Prix of Figure Skating was a series of invitational senior internationals which ran from October through December 2017. Medals were awarded in the disciplines of men's singles, ladies' singles, pair skating, and ice dancing. Skaters earned points based on their placement at each event and the top six in each discipline qualified to compete at the Grand Prix Final in Nagoya.

Organized by the International Skating Union, the series set the stage for the 2018 Europeans, the 2018 Four Continents, 2018 Olympic Games, and the 2018 World Championships. The corresponding series for junior-level skaters was the 2017–18 ISU Junior Grand Prix.

Schedule
The series was composed of the following events:

Requirements 
Skaters were eligible to compete on the senior Grand Prix circuit if they had reached the age of 15 before July 1, 2017. They were also required to have earned either a minimum total score or minimum technical elements scores (TES) at certain international events:

Assignments
The ISU published the preliminary Grand Prix assignments on May 26, 2017.

Men

Ladies

Pairs

Ice dance

Changes to preliminary assignments

Rostelecom Cup

Skate Canada International

Cup of China

NHK Trophy

Internationaux de France

Skate America

Medal summary

Medalists

Medal standings

Qualification 
At each event, skaters earned points toward qualification for the Grand Prix Final. Following the sixth event, the top six highest scoring skaters/teams advanced to the Final. The points earned per placement were as follows:

There were originally seven tie-breakers in cases of a tie in overall points:
	Highest placement at an event. If a skater placed 1st and 3rd, the tiebreaker is the 1st place, and that beats a skater who placed 2nd in both events.
	Highest combined total scores in both events. If a skater earned 200 points at one event and 250 at a second, that skater would win in the second tie-break over a skater who earned 200 points at one event and 150 at another.
	Participated in two events.
	Highest combined scores in the free skating/free dancing portion of both events.
	Highest individual score in the free skating/free dancing portion from one event.
	Highest combined scores in the short program/short dance of both events.
	Highest number of total participants at the events.

If a tie remained, it was considered unbreakable and the tied skaters all advanced to the Grand Prix Final.

Qualification standings
Bold denotes Grand Prix Final qualification.

Qualifiers

Top Grand Prix scores

Men

Total score

Short program

Free program

Ladies

Total score

Short program

Free program

Pairs

Total score

Short program

Free program

Ice dancing

Total score

Short dance

Free dance

References

External links 
 ISU Grand Prix of Figure Skating at the International Skating Union

Isu Grand Prix Of Figure Skating, 2017-18
ISU Grand Prix of Figure Skating